Ranularia exilis, common name: the slender triton, is a species of predatory sea snail, a marine gastropod mollusk in the family Cymatiidae.

Description
The shell size varies between 40 mm and 60 mm.

Distribution
This species is distributed in the Red Sea and the West Pacific Ocean.

References

 Vine, P. (1986). Red Sea Invertebrates. Immel Publishing, London. 224 pp.

External links
 

Cymatiidae
Gastropods described in 1844